Australia ranked third in top study abroad destinations with a total market value of over 5 billion AUD (3.47 billion USD) generated by international students in 2018. In 2018, 869,709 international students were enrolled in educational programs in Australia, which was about 8.8% higher than the amount in 2017 (799,371). They come to gain a high-quality education, possibly immigrate, or to experience a different life. Each year, many new international students will enroll in Australian courses and add to the already significant international student body around the country.

Australia has the highest ratio of international students per capita in the world by a large margin. In 2019, international students represented an average 26.7% of the student body population in Australian universities. International education therefore represents one of the country's largest exports and has a pronounced influence on the country's demographics, with a significant proportion of international students remaining in Australia after graduation on various skill and employment visas.

According to data released by the Departure of Education and Training of the Australian Government, China is the most significant source of international students to Australia. India had the second largest proportion of the enrollments, followed by Brazil, Nepal and Malaysia.

All international students are required to obtain a valid student visa before they arrive in Australia. When students apply for their student visa through the Department of Home Affairs of the Australian Government, they need to submit the electronic Confirmation of Enrolment (CoE) and a compulsory English language proficiency test score to lodge their visa application. Also, each student visa applicant must prove that they have enough financial ability to pay for their tuition fees, books and daily living expenses while they study in Australia.

After the Australian government published the new immigration policy, international students are encouraged to study, work and stay in regional areas in Australia, such as Adelaide, Tasmania and the Northern Territory. In order to protect the local workforces, the Australian government intends to reduce the number of accepted migrants, and in the long-term, the government aims to set the cap of skilled immigration to about 160,000.

Definitions 
In Australia, a student is considered as an international student if he/she is not an Australian citizen, Australian permanent resident, New Zealand citizen, or a holder of an Australian permanent resident humanitarian visa.

Classification

By destinations

Popular destinations 
The top 3 states in Australia for foreign enrolment in 2018 are listed below.

Distribution of International Students in major cities and regional areas 

In 2018, 3% of international students enrolled in Australia stayed in regional locations of Australia, while 97% of international students chose to settle down in major cities. All enrolments in Tasmania and the Northern Territory are considered as enrolled in regional areas.

New South Wales had the largest number of international students, up to 333,913. Queensland had the largest regional area proportion (5%), followed by New South Wales (1%) and Victoria (1%).

China was the main source country for enrolments, which contributed 24% of regional area enrolments. Nepal (7%) had the second large proportion of the regional area enrolments, followed by Malaysia, South Korea and the US, all of which are contributed three per cent to total regional enrolments. 

Top 10 regional centres for international student enrolments in 2018 are listed below.

By sending countries and regions 
Top 15 countries and regions sending students to Australia in 2018 are listed below.

Requirements

Student visa 
Generally, international students as citizens of other countries are required to obtain a valid student visa, which ascertains their legal status for staying in Australia. Students who have obtained the Student Visa (subclass 500) can stay in Australia for up to 5 years, depending on their enrolment. In Australia, when students apply for their visa, they need to get the Confirmation of Enrolment (CoE) for each course and submit it to the Department of Home Affairs of the Australian Government. Overseas Student Health Cover (OSHC) is compulsory for all overseas students. Each student visa applicant must prove that they have enough financial ability to pay for their tuition, books and daily living expenses while they study in Australia. Overseas students enrolled in an English Language Intensive Courses for Overseas Students (ELICOS, offered by secondary schools) with a student visa are required to study full time (tourist and visitors to Australia can also participate in ELICOS study during their stay).

On 1 July 2016, after a new Simplified Student Visa Framework (SSVF) was implemented in Australia, the Department of Home Affairs of Australian Government introduced a new immigration risk framework to determine the amount of documents a student needs to submit with their application form, based on their country of citizenship and intended education provider.

According to the new released Simplified Student Visa Framework (SSVF), foreign students are able to provide a Confirmation of Enrolment (CoE) to meet the English language requirements for their student visa application. The Confirmation of Enrolment (CoE) is a piece of evidence to prove that the English language requirements for their course are equal to or higher than the requirements for a student visa. However, those foreign students who assessed at a higher immigration risk level will still need to attend an English language test and to provide evidence of their English language proficiency through one of the English tests accepted by Australia with an approved test score.

English language proficiency requirements 
International students who apply to study in Australia will need to meet English language proficiency requirements to obtain a valid student visa. Students must have taken the English language test in the last two years before they apply for a students visa, or the validity will expire.

English language proficiency evidence exemptions 
All international students will need to meet the English language proficiency requirements to gain entry into their course and receive a student visa.

Some international students are exempt from providing evidence of English language proficiency with their visa application if they satisfy one or more of the following requirements:

 Students who are a citizen and passport holder of UK, USA, Canada, New Zealand or the Republic of Ireland.
An applicant who is a Foreign Affairs or, Defence sponsored student or a Secondary Exchange Student (AASES).
Students who have completed at least five years of study in one or more of the following countries: Australia, UK, USA, Canada, New Zealand, South Africa, or the Republic of Ireland.
In last two years of applying for a student visa, students who have completed either the Senior Secondary Certificate of Education or a course leading to a qualification from the Australian Qualifications Framework at the Certificate IV or higher level in Australia.
Students enrolled full time in school studies as a principal course (including secondary exchange programs), a registered postgraduate research or a standalone English Language Intensive Courses for Overseas Students (ELICOS) program

All other students are required to provide evidence of English language proficiency (with a Confirmation of Enrolment(CoE) or an approved English language test scores).

Types of English Language Proficiency tests accepted in Australia 
There are five types of English language proficiency (ELP) tests accepted for student visa applications in Australia:

International English Language Testing System (IELTS)
Test of English as a Foreign Language (TOEFL) *internet-based test (paper-based test is also accepted)
Cambridge English: Advanced (CAE)
Pearson Test of English Academic (PTE Academic)
Occupational English Test (OET)

Minimum English language proficiency test score required 
The requirements for English language proficiency tests scores will vary depending on the institution they choose, their country of citizenship and whether they are preparing to enrol in an English Language Intensive Courses for Overseas Students (ELICOS) course.

For student visa applicants, the minimum scores accepted for each test are listed in the table below.

for the international students who do not meet the English language test requirement, they are suggested to complete an English Language Intensive Courses for Overseas Students (ELICOS) to improve their English language skills.

However, even though the government have provided the minimum English language proficiency tests scores required for student visa application, foreign students may still need to get a higher score to get enrolled into their desire institution and courses. Some specific courses, such as law, education, medical programs, are likely to have a higher requirement, while the requirements for an English Language Intensive Courses for Overseas Students (ELICOS) and Vocational Education and Training (VET) courses are usually lower.

Impact on Australia's economy 
According to the survey prepared by Deloitte Access Economics and the Australian government, international education was predicted to contribute about seventeen billion to Australia's GDP in a 2014-15 financial year. This value is the sum of:

 Twelve billion of direct value which is the paid tuition fee to the education providers and the learning materials and services which sold to the students
 Five billion of indirect value, which is the payment of the education providers to their suppliers, for example, printing and information technology support services.

Apart from that, international students make a substantial contribution to the development of many regional areas as there is at least five per cent of students living and studying in those communities. In 2014–15, the international student spent about 3 billion of expenditure (for purchasing goods and services) to Melbourne while 900 million indirect value flowed to regional communities and massively supported the agricultural products and other linkages. Finally, the consequence of student consumption supported approximately 12,746 jobs in regional Victoria.

Furthermore, in 2014–2015, The stocks of international students were estimated to deliver about 130,000 skilled migrants after the graduation year. This number of skilled migrants had increased 3% of Australia's current workforce with tertiary education. In the financial year of 2018, international students inject $31.9 billion into the Australian economy, directly boosting Australian jobs and wages, generating jobs, supporting wages, and lifting the living standards of Australia.

International students inject almost $32 billion into Australia's economy each year and support 130,000 Australian jobs. They also bring Australia and the world closer together, and built important diplomatic and personal ties.

According to the warning by NSW auditors, Australian universities is now suffering from a "market concentration risk" since their finance and budget rely too much on foreign student fees. As the report shows, in the New South Wales, the international students tuition fees injects $2.8 billion AUD into universities, which accounts for 28% of the total revenue. The University of Sydney and the University of New South Wales, two universities in NSW, accounted for more than 50% of their total revenue from international students' tuition fees.

Controversies 
In recent year, the increasing number of international students in Australia has become a concern. Some students were encountering mental health problems, while some scholars have expressed concerns about English language ability of the international students. Also, the patriotism of students from mainland China have created some conflicts in Australian university campuses.

Mental Health problem 
In 2019, there was a reported from Coroners Prevention Unit stating the international students are facing pressure related to study failure, expectation from parents and English language abilities.

English language abilities of students from China 
Salvatore Babones, an associate professor of the University of Sydney wrote some articles stating the fact that the students from mainland China had poor English language standard. And yet, many universities are denying the problems.

Extension of 2019–20 Hong Kong protests into universities campus 
Since March 2019, there has been a number of protests owing to the 2019 Hong Kong extradition bill. Some students from Hong Kong would like to support the protest in Hong Kong, but some of them said that they felt being monitored by the mainland students, and were provoked by the students from mainland China even if the Hong Kong students were solely expressing their opinion peacefully. 
On 24 July 2019, there was a supporting protest at the Great Court of Queensland University (UQ) initiated by Drew Pavlou, a student representative to UQ's senate. The protest was echoed by some students from Hong Kong. They urged for the acceptance of the five requests in Hong Kong (Complete withdrawal of the bill, Withdrawal determining the protests as "riots", cancellation of Political prosecution on the protesters, independent investigation on the violence of the police and the implementation of real universal suffrage), urging for the closure of the Confucius Institute at the Queensland University, shutting down the Xinjiang re-education camps. Nevertheless, the protest was developed into a conflict. Some students from mainland China (The Consulate-General of PRC in Brisbane claimed that also included students from Hong Kong, but it was not proven by other media) initiated anti-separation and anti Hong Kong independence protests. Some mainland destroyed the Lennon Wall and poster established by the Hong Kong students, and openly sang the Chinese National Song. Pavlou was attacked by the Chinese student and was injured.

PRC Consul-General in Brisbane responded by confirming the patriotic act of the mainland students and condemning the "anti-Chinese" activities initiated by the Hong Kong students. In October 2019, Pavlou has sought a court order similar to a restraining order against the Chinese Consul-General in Brisbane, Xu Jie.

Immigration policy for international students 
Most international students who come to study in Australia wish to reside here permanently. The student-migration nexus in Australia is pretty complex and is constantly evolving.

The current immigration policy published by Australian government encourages foreign students to work and stay in regional areas, such as Adelaide and Tasmania, by reducing the quota of skilled independent visa entrants (change from subclass 175 and subclass 885 to subclass 189), and in the meantime increasing the number of skilled regional (provisional) visa (change from subclass 457 to 489).

In 2017, the government accepted about 162,000 migrants, which was about 10% lower than the accepted amount in 2016. The long-term forecast of the Australian Government aims to set the cap of skilled immigrants to about 160,000. The primary reason behind such decisions is to protect the local workforces and also to diminish the tension between locals and the recent immigrants. For instance, locals believe that the investment and settlement of the immigrants has led to the recent rapid increase in accommodation market price and the decreasing quality of health and welfare in Australia.

One of the primary reasons for some international students to study in Australia is to settle down after their graduation. Hence, the change in the policy will hugely affect the graduation pathway of international students. Since the new policy is published recently, further research will need to be conducted later for obtaining more relevant information to understand its effects on the students. For instance, a survey can be conducted for the selected group.

References 

Education in Australia
Study abroad programs
Expatriates in Australia